The Psychological Society of Ireland/ Cumann Síceolaithe Éireann (PSI) is the learned and professional body for psychology and psychologists in the Republic of Ireland.

History
The Society was established in 1970 by a group of seventeen people. This was proceeded by consultation and planning that led to the establishment of a single body to represent psychologists throughout Ireland. It has since grown to over 3,500 people.

Divisions and groups
The Society has ten Divisions which represent the interests of members in the key academic/professional disciplines.  These are:
 Academics, Teachers and Researchers in Psychology 
 Behaviour Analysis 
 Clinical Psychology 
 Counselling Psychology
 Forensic Psychology
 Health Psychology 
 Neuropsychology 
 Psychotherapy
 Sport, Exercise and Performance Psychology 
 Work and Organisational Psychology

It also has eight Special Interest Groups to represent more specialised interests. These are:
 Addiction
 Autistic Spectrum Disorders
 Coaching Psychology
 Eating Disorders
 Intellectual Disabilities 
 Media, the Arts and Cyberpsychology 
 Paediatric Psychology 
 Perinatal and Infant Mental Health

Publications
 Irish Journal of Psychology
 The Irish Psychologist

Awards
The Society makes the following awards each year:
 Early Career Psychologists;
 Award for contribution to Research in Psychology;
 Award for contribution to Professional Practice Psychology.

Presidents
The following have been Presidents of the Society:

External collaborations
The PSI has established memoranda of understanding with several other psychological organisations including the American Psychological Association and the British Psychological Society.

References

External links
 PSI website

Psychology organisations based in Europe
Organizations established in 1970
Psychology journals
Learned societies of Ireland
Professional associations based in Ireland
Organisations based in Dublin (city)
Ireland
Ireland